Harvey Summit is a peak  high at the head of McDermott Glacier in the Royal Society Range of Victoria Land, Antarctica. It was named after John W. Harvey of the National Solar Observatory who, along with Thomas L. Duvall, Jr. and Martin Pomerantz, conducted research in helioseismology at the South Pole for some years from 1980 onwards.

References

Mountains of Victoria Land
Scott Coast